Rudolf Gwalther (1519–1586) was a Reformed pastor and Protestant reformer who succeeded Heinrich Bullinger as Antistes of the Zurich church.

Life 

Gwalther was born the son of a carpenter, who died when he was young. Heinrich Bullinger assumed responsibility for Gwalther's upbringing. He attended schools in Kappel, Basel, Strasbourg, Lausanne and Marburg and studied mathematics and poetry in addition to theology. He learned French and Italian in Lausanne. Landgrave Philip of Hesse brought the gifted student along to the Regensburg Colloquy in 1541. When he returned to Zurich, he received the pastorate of St Peter's Church to replace Leo Jud. He married Huldrych Zwingli’s daughter Regula (1524–1565).

He was an inspiring and popular preacher. His sermons and biblical commentaries have been frequently printed and widely read. As Zwingli’s son-in-law, he sought to preserve the great reformer's heritage and remained true to his theological orientation. Gwalther's Latin translations of Zwingli's works helped disseminate his thought in the Romance language world.

For Bullinger, he was a valuable collaborator in the management of the Zurich church and in assisting with his widely dispersed correspondence network. Outside of historical narratives, he produced numerous translations, and composed Latin poems and spiritual songs. Following Bullinger’s wish, Gwalther was elected in 1575 as his successor as Antistes at the Grossmünster. He held this difficult office until 1585, when his declining mental state forced him from the post. He was succeeded as head of the Zurich church by his longtime colleague Ludwig Lavater.

Influence
He had contacts with English Calvinists through John Parkhurst, in exile in Zurich in the 1550s. His works were one of the influences on the English vestments controversy of the 1560s; and his sermons were translated by Robert Norton of Ipswich in the 1570s. His son, Rudolf Gwalther the younger (1552–77), likewise enhanced his influence in England when he studied in Oxford in the early 1570s. Gwalther was in regular communication with English bishops. With Zwingli, Bullinger, Wolfgang Musculus, and Thomas Erastus, Gwalther was a prime advocate of the Swiss German single-sphere model of church-state relations, and was a significant influence on the evolution of a statist model of church organization within the Church of England.

References

Sources
 J. Wayne Baker (1996) "Rudolf Gwalther," in  Hans J. Hillerbrand, ed., The Oxford Encyclopedia of the Reformation, vol 2, 203.

External links
 

 
 
 

1519 births
1586 deaths
Swiss Calvinist and Reformed theologians
16th-century Calvinist and Reformed theologians
16th-century Swiss people